Prison 313 or Jordan Misja Prison is a prison in Tirana, Albania.

Prison breaks
 Ajet Marku, 20 years, fled on 1 December 2010.

See also
Prison of Burrel
Spaç Prison

References

Buildings and structures in Tirana
Prisons in Albania